Cycle, cycles, or cyclic may refer to:

Anthropology and social sciences
 Cyclic history, a theory of history
 Cyclical theory, a theory of American political history associated with Arthur Schlesinger, Sr.
 Social cycle, various cycles in social sciences
 Business cycle, the downward and upward movement of gross domestic product (GDP) around its ostensible, long-term growth trend

Arts, entertainment, and media

Films
 Cycle (2008 film), a Malayalam film
 Cycle (2017 film), a Marathi film

Literature
 Cycle (magazine), an American motorcycling enthusiast magazine
 Literary cycle, a group of stories focused on common figures

Music

Musical terminology
 Cycle (music), a set of musical pieces that belong together 
Cyclic form, a technique of construction involving multiple sections or movements
Interval cycle, a collection of pitch classes generated from a sequence of the same interval class
Song cycle, individually complete songs designed to be performed in a sequence as a unit

Albums
 Cycle (album), a 1965 album by the Paul Horn Quintet
 Cycle, a 2003 album by Merzbow
 Cycle, a 2014 album by Buckethead

 Cycles (Cartel album), 2009
 Cycles (David Darling album), 1981
 Cycles (The Doobie Brothers album), 1989
 Cycles (Frank Sinatra album), 1968
 Cycles (Redbone album), 1977
 Cycles, a 2021 album by Sam Teskey

Songs
 "Cycles" (song), a 2018 song by Tove Lo
 "Cycle" an interlude by Beck from Morning Phase, 2014

Science, technology, and mathematics

Biology
 Cycle (gene), a gene in Drosophila melanogaster that encodes the CYCLE protein
 Cyclic flower, in botany, one way in which flower parts may be arranged
 Menstrual cycle

Computing
 Cycles, a render engine for the software Blender
 Instruction cycle, the time period during which a computer processes a machine language instruction
 Reference cycle, where a software object refers directly or indirectly to itself

Mathematics
 Cycle (algebraic topology), a simplicial chain with 0 boundary
 Cycle per second, a unit of frequency, the modern equivalent being hertz
 Cycle (graph theory), a nontrivial path in a graph from a node to itself
 Cycle graph, a graph that is itself a cycle
 Cycle matroid, a matroid derived from the cycle structure of a graph
 Cycle (sequence), a sequence with repeating values
 Cycle detection, the algorithmic problem of detecting eventual repetitions in sequences generated by iterated functions
 Cycle, a set equipped with a cyclic order
 Necklace (combinatorics), equivalence classes of cyclically ordered sequences of symbols modulo certain symmetries
 Cyclic (mathematics), a list of mathematics articles with "cyclic" in the title
 Cyclic group, a group generated by a single element
 Cyclic permutation, a basic permutation (all permutations are products of cycles)

Other uses in science and technology
 Charge cycle, charging and discharging a rechargeable battery
 Thermodynamic cycle, a sequence of processes that involve transfer of heat and work into and out of a system
 Cyclic, a primary flight control for helicopters
 Cyclic compound

Vehicles
 Bicycle
 Motorcycle
 Quadricycle
 Tricycle
 Unicycle

Other uses
 Cycling, a sport
 Cycle (baseball), a single, double, triple, and home run (in any order) by the same player in one game
 Cycle, North Carolina, a community in the United States

See also
 Frequency (disambiguation)
 List of cycles
 Periodicity (disambiguation)
 The Cycle (disambiguation)